Chanticleer is a full-time male classical vocal ensemble based in San Francisco, California, founded in 1978. It is known for its interpretations of Renaissance music, for which they were founded, but also a wide repertoire of jazz, gospel and contemporary classical music.  Its name is derived from the "clear singing rooster" in Chaucer's The Canterbury Tales. The ensemble has made award-winning recordings.

History
Chanticleer was founded in 1978 by tenor Louis Botto, who sang with the group until 1989, and served as Artistic Director until his death from AIDS in 1997. As a graduate student of musicology, Botto found that much of the medieval and Renaissance music he was studying was not being performed, and, because of this, he formed the group to perform this music with an all-male ensemble, as it was traditionally sung during the Renaissance.

Originally, the group contained ten singers, but its size has varied from eight to twelve. Currently, Chanticleer comprises twelve men, including two basses, one baritone, three tenors, and six countertenors (three altos and three sopranos).

The original members included Jim Armington (tenor), Ted Bakkila (baritone), Rob Bell (countertenor), Louis Botto (who sang alto as well as tenor), Sanford Dole (tenor), Kevin Freeman (bass), Tom Hart (baritone), Jonathan Klein (baritone), Neal Rogers (tenor), Tim Gibler (bass), Randall Wong (countertenor), and Doug Wyatt (bass).  However, only ten of the singers were available to go on tour.

When the ensemble first became full-time in 1991, its members included Eric Alatorre (bass and longest-standing member as of his retirement after the 2018–2019 season), Frank Albinder (baritone), Kevin Baum (tenor), Mark Daniel (tenor), Kenneth Fitch (countertenor), Jonathan Goodman (tenor), Tim Gibler (bass and last member of the original ensemble), Joseph Jennings (countertenor and Music Director), Chad Runyon (baritone), Foster Sommerlad (countertenor), Matthew Thompson (tenor), and Philip Wilder (countertenor).

Discography

 1988 – The Anniversary Album, 1978–1988<ref>[https://www.allmusic.com/album/the-anniversary-album-1978-1988-mw0001917052 The Anniversary Album, 1978–1988] AllMusic</ref>
 1990 – Our Heart's Joy: A Chanticleer Christmas (remastered in 2004)
 1991 – Psallite! A Renaissance Christmas 1992 – Josquin: Missa Mater Patris; Agricola: Magnificat and motets
 1993 – Byrd: Missa In Tempore Paschali 1993 – Cristóbal de Morales: Missa Mille Regretz and motets
 1993 – Mysteria: Gregorian Chants 1994 – Where the Sun Will Never Go Down 1994 – Out of This World 1994 – Palestrina: Missa pro defunctis; motets
 1994 – Mexican Baroque 1994 – Our Heart's Joy / A Chanticleer Christmas 1995 – Sing We Christmas 1996 – Old-fashioned Christmas 1996 – Lost in the Stars 1998 – Wondrous Love: A World Folk Song Collection 1998 – Byrd: Music for a Hidden Chapel 1997 – Reflections 1998 – Jerusalem: Matins for the Virgin of Guadalupe, 1764
 1999 – The Music of 1999 – Colors of Love, works by Augusta Read Thomas, Steven Stucky, John Tavener and Bernard Rands.
 2000 – Magnificat, works by Josquin Desprez, Giovanni Palestrina, Tomás Luis de Victoria, John Taverner, William Cornysh, Vasily Polikarpovich Titov and Claudio Monteverdi
 2001 – Glory to Christmas 2001 – Christmas with Chanticleer 2002 – John Tavener: Lamentations and Praises 2002 – Our American Journey 2003 – Evening Prayer: Purcell Anthems and Sacred Songs 2003 – A Portrait 2004 – How Sweet the Sound: Spirituals and Traditional Gospel Music, arrangements by Joseph Jennings
 2004 – Music for a Hidden Chapel 2005 – Sound in Spirit, works by Carlos Rafael Rivera, Joseph Jennings, Victoria, Alfonso X of Castile, Jan Gilbert, Patricia Van Ness, Nectarie Vlahul, Sarah Hopkins, Giacinto Scelsi and Jackson Hill
 2007 – And on Earth, Peace: A Chanticleer Mass 2007 – Let it Snow 2008 – Mission Road 2009 – I Have Had Singing: A Chanticleer Portrait 2010 – A Chanticleer Christmas 2011 – Our Favorite Carols 2011 – Between Two Wars 2011 – Chanticleer Takes You Out of this World! 2011 – For Thy Soul's Salvation 2011 – Jean-Yves Daniel-Lesur: Annunciation 2011 – Ludus Paschalis: Resurrection Play of Tours 2011 – My Chanticleer: A Collection for Chanticleer 2011 – The Boy Whose Father was God 2011 – With a Poet's Eye 2012 – Love Story 2012 – By Request 2013 – The Siren's Call 2013 – Someone New 2014 – She Said/He Said 2015 – Over the Moon 2017 – Heart of a Soldier 2018 – Then and There, Here and Now 2020 – Chanticleer Sings ChristmasIn May 2007, Chanticleer released "And On Earth, Peace: A Chanticleer Mass" (Warner Classics) a new mass written by five contemporary composers. Israeli-born composer Shulamit Ran wrote the Credo to the Hebrew text "Ani Ma'amin"; US composer Douglas Cuomo contributed the Kyrie; Turkish-American composer Kamran Ince composed the Gloria section to a sufi text; English composer Ivan Moody composed the Sanctus; and Irish composer Michael McGlynn (director of Anúna) composed the Agnus Dei. The Mass was premiered in performance at the Metropolitan Museum of Art in New York City and was followed by six performances throughout the San Francisco Bay area.The New York Times has more on the repertoire here .

On October 16, 2007, Chanticleer released "Let it Snow," the group's 29th recording.  A portion of the album is accompanied by orchestra and/or big band; as such, the album brings a new sound to Chanticleer's almost exclusively a cappella repertoire.

 Notable past members 
 Frank Albinder (baritone), designed the concept and chose the repertoire for Chanticleer's Grammy Award-winning album Colors of Love Philip Wilder
 Matt Alber
 Terry Barber

 Awards and honors 
Joseph Jennings (as artistic director) and Chanticleer won a Grammy Award for Best Small Ensemble Performance for their 1999 recording Colors of Love. Chanticleer was awarded two Grammy Awards, in categories Best Small Ensemble Performance and Best Classical Contemporary Composition, their 2002 recording of Taverner's Lamentations and Praises. Their 2003 recording Our American Journey was nominated for a Grammy a year later.

In November 2007, in its 30th anniversary season, Chanticleer was named Musical America''s 2008 Ensemble of the year. This marks the first time a vocal ensemble has received this award. Additionally, on October 9, 2008, Chanticleer became the first vocal ensemble to be inducted into the American Classical Music Hall of Fame in Cincinnati, Ohio.

References

External links
 Official site
 
 

Early music choirs
Grammy Award winners
Choirs in the San Francisco Bay Area
Musical groups from San Francisco
Musical groups established in 1978
1978 establishments in California